Exit Wounds is a graphic novel written and drawn by Rutu Modan about a search of a missing lover and a missing father in modern Tel Aviv, during the tense time of bombs attack in Israel.

Plot summary
The book follows a search of a young woman, Numi, for her old lover, who disappeared just before a suicide bomb that left an unidentified body. Numi calls Koby, a cab-driver and the missing person's son, to help her in the search. Exit Wounds challenges the idea of the corrosive influence of the search for an ending.

Publication history
The graphic novel, published in Hardcover on 2007 by Drawn & Quarterly, and in paperback in 2008. It was published in Hebrew on 2008 by Am-Oved with the name קרוב רחוק Karov Rahok "close-far". It won the 2008 Eisner Award for Best New Graphic Novel, and the 2008 "Essentials of Angoulême".

See also
 Alternative comics

References

External links
 Rutu Modan 'Exit Wounds' Interview

2007 graphic novels
Comics by Rutu Modan
Drawn & Quarterly titles
Israeli graphic novels
Eisner Award winners for Best Graphic Album: New
Comics set in Israel